Lucius Kadeem Fox Jr. (born July 2, 1997) is a Bahamian professional baseball shortstop in the Washington Nationals organization. He made his MLB debut with the Nationals in 2022.

Career

San Francisco Giants
Fox is from Nassau, Bahamas. He began playing baseball when he was seven years old, and moved to the United States at age 12 to continue his career. Fox attended American Heritage High School in Delray Beach, Florida. He moved back to the Bahamas in time to be declared an international free agent during the 2015 signing period. Fox signed with the San Francisco Giants, for a reported $6 million signing bonus. He spent his first professional season, in 2016, with the Augusta GreenJackets of the Class A South Atlantic League, posting a .207 batting average and a .305 on-base percentage in 75 games played.

Tampa Bay Rays

On August 1, 2016, the Giants traded Fox, Matt Duffy, and Michael Santos to the Tampa Bay Rays for Matt Moore. He did not play for the Rays after the trade due to a bone bruise on his foot sustained while playing for Augusta. Fox began the 2017 season with the Bowling Green Hot Rods of the Class A Midwest League. He represented the World Team in the 2017 All-Star Futures Game. After batting .278 with two home runs, 27 runs batted in (RBIs), and 27 stolen bases in 77 games for Bowling Green, the Rays promoted Fox to the Charlotte Stone Crabs of the Class A-Advanced Florida State League, where he finished the season, batting .235 with one home run and 12 RBIs in 30 games. In 2018, he played for both Charlotte and the Montgomery Biscuits of the Class AA Southern League, slashing .268/.351/.341 with three home runs, 39 RBIs, and 29 stolen bases in 116 total games between the two teams. He split the 2019 season between Montgomery and the Durham Bulls, hitting a combined .221/.331/.327/.658 with 3 home runs, 34 RBI, and 39 stolen bases. Fox was added to the Rays 40–man roster following the 2019 season.

Kansas City Royals
On August 27, 2020, the Rays traded Fox to the Kansas City Royals in exchange for Brett Phillips. On July 30, 2021, Fox was promoted to the major leagues for the first time, but did not appear in the Royals' game against the Toronto Blue Jays and was optioned back to the Triple-A Omaha Storm Chasers the next day.

Washington Nationals
Fox was claimed first by the Baltimore Orioles on November 19, 2021, and then the Washington Nationals when the Orioles attempted to pass him through waivers eleven days later on November 30.

Fox made the Nationals Opening Day roster in 2022 and he made his major league debut on April 10. In his debut game, he deployed a safety squeeze bunt to tie the game in the eighth inning, ultimately leading to a Nationals come-from-behind win. Fox recorded his first MLB hit on May 1, and was optioned to the Triple-A Rochester Red Wings on May 3. On December 13, Fox was designated for assignment by the Nationals.

See also
List of Major League Baseball players from the Bahamas

References

External links

Living people
1997 births
Bahamian expatriate baseball players in the United States
Major League Baseball players from the Bahamas
Sportspeople from Nassau, Bahamas
Major League Baseball shortstops
Washington Nationals players
Augusta GreenJackets players
Bowling Green Hot Rods players
Charlotte Stone Crabs players
Montgomery Biscuits players
Peoria Javelinas players
Durham Bulls players
Omaha Storm Chasers players
Arizona Complex League Royals players
Rochester Red Wings players